KCFB is a Christian radio station licensed to Saint Cloud, Minnesota, broadcasting on 91.5 MHz FM.  The station is owned by Minnesota Christian Broadcasters, Inc.

Programming
KCFB's programming includes Christian talk and teaching shows such as Truth for Life with Alistair Begg, Turning Point with David Jeremiah, Insight For Living with Chuck Swindoll, Revive Our Hearts with Nancy DeMoss Wolgemuth, In Touch with Dr. Charles Stanley, Focus on the Family, and In the Market with Janet Parshall.  KTIG also airs a variety of Christian music.

History
KCFB began broadcasting in 1987, and initially ran 800 watts. The station was purchased by Minnesota Christian Broadcasters in November 1997.  In November 1999, KCFB increased power to 15,000 watts.

References

External links

Christian radio stations in Minnesota
Moody Radio affiliate stations
Radio stations in St. Cloud, Minnesota
Radio stations established in 1987
1987 establishments in Minnesota